Greater China Transport Logistics (GCTL8.com) is a daily news web portal providing transport, logistics and supply chain management news in the Asia Pacific region. It is operated by FocusAsia Media Ltd. It publishes daily China logistics news in English, Traditional Chinese and Simplified Chinese. The company also publishes GCTL Insights Magazine which provides both online and print version. A group of experienced journalists in the field of transportation and logistics provides an alternative view and unbiased commentary on industry developments in Asia at GCTL8.com.

History 
The news web portal, GCTL8.com, started operations in 2005. It records an average of over 2 million hits monthly and its daily email newsletter reaches about 40,000 subscribers.

On 25 November 2008, GCTL8.com have formally become members of the China Federation of Logistics and Purchasing and the China Logistics Society (CLS). GCTL8.com will publish the latest regulations pertaining to Logistics and purchasing directly. In addition, they are also partners with a China Customs consulting firm, FollowMission, and will be able to bring the latest China Customs regulations to the readers.

GCTL8.com was the media partner of The Freight Summit 2010, held at The Venetian Macao.

GCTL Insights Magazine 
GCTL Insights Magazine, sister publication of GCTL8.com, was launched in January 2010. In the first two issues, Insights Magazine was only published in PDF and FLIP version. It then went into print from its third issue, March/April 2010, to meet customers' demand. The magazine features in-depth articles like "China’s Logistics Development Update" by logistics industry veteran Mark Millar, managing director of M Power Associates, and other well-known industry professionals. It also includes exclusive interviews with various industry experts about their activities in China.

Editorial
Wong Joon San is the editor of GCTL Insights Magazine. He was formerly editor of South China Morning Post's Freight & Shipping Post and also writes for several trade magazine specialized in the transport logistics industry. He believed that Insights Magazine, which will be distributed to transport logistics and supply chain management executives and any interested parties, is expected to gain recognition in China, when its Chinese version is published in the near future.

Event Organiser 
The International Forwarders Awards China 2011 (IFA China 2011) event was held on May 19, 2011 in Ningbo city, Zhejiang province, China. Organized jointly by GCTL8.com, The Freight Summit and China Logistics Club, fully supported by the Ningbo Association of Port-of-Entry – a government body, the IFA 2011 aims to recognize Small and Medium-Sized Freight Forwarder and Logistics Services Providers’ important role in trade and commerce and their contributions to excellence and quality of services to the functioning of global supply chains.

Features
GCTL8.com membership is two-tiered. Paid members can gain full access to its daily news, email newsletter contents and the other benefits including GCTL Insights Magazine, Special Reports, Archives, Cargo Leads, Urgently Wanted Ads data etc. Non paying members can gain limited access of GCTL Insights Magazine for two current issues while they cannot access to back issues of GCTL Insights Magazine and they can only read the first three lines of each daily news in GCTL8.com as well as email newsletter.

See also
 Greater China

References

External links 
 Greater China Transport Logistics website

Internet properties established in 2005
Chinese news websites
Newspaper companies of Hong Kong